The 1908 Florida football team represented the University of Florida during the 1908 college football season. The season was Jack Forsythe's third and last as the head coach of the University of Florida football team.  Forsythe's 1908 Florida football team posted a record of 5–2–1 in their third varsity season.

Before the season
The team was captained by veteran transfer William Gibbs. It was the first season for a talented Gainesville product, Dummy Taylor. The backfield also included Charlie Bartleson Jim Vidal, and William A. Shands, future state senator and namesake of Shands Hospital.

One story of Florida becoming the "Florida Gators" originates in 1908. Gainesville shop owner ordered orange and blue pennants with a gator emblem from the Michie Company, drawing inspiration from the University of Virginia.

Schedule

Season summary

Mercer
The Florida football team opened the season with a loss to the Mercer Baptists for the third consecutive season, 24–0. Mercer outweighed Florida by 20 pounds.

The starting lineup was Malhorton (left end), Rader (left tackle), Vanfleet (left guard), Parker (center), Videll (right guard), J. Taylor (right tackle), Shands (right end), Thompson (quarterback), Bartleson (left halfback), E. Taylor (right halfback), Gibbs (fullback).

Riverside A. C.

Florida beat the Riverside Athletic Club of Jacksonville twice. The first win was 4–0. Former Gator Roy Corbett coached and played right halfback for Riverside.

Gainesville A. C.
The Gainesville Athletic Club fell to Florida 37–5.

Columbia College
Columbia College of Lake City was beaten 6–0.

Rollins

Florida lost to the state champion Rollins Tars 5–0. Rollins' Harman broke away for a 30-yard touchdown in the second half.

Stetson
Florida also played the Stetson Hatters for the first time, beating them 6–5 on the Orange and Blue's home field in Gainesville. Dummy Taylor's extra point decided the win over Stetson, after a Charlie Bartleson touchdown run.

Riverside A. C.
The second win over Riverside was 37–0.

Stetson

Florida tied Stetson 0–0 in a rematch on the Hatters' home field in DeLand, Florida.

The starting lineup was Moody (left end), Taylor (left tackle), Shands (left guard), Parker (center), McMillan (right guard), Rader (right tackle), Haughton (right end), Bartleson (quarterback), Gibbs (left halfback), E. Taylor (right halfback), Vidal (fullback).

Postseason
Forsythe finished his three-year tenure as Florida's football coach with an overall record of 14–6–2.

References

Bibliography
 
 

Florida
Florida Gators football seasons
Florida football